The 2015 Copa Verde was the 2nd edition of a football competition held in Brazil, featuring 16 clubs. Pará has three clubs; Amazonas, Distrito Federal, and Mato Grosso have two each; and Acre, Amapá, Espírito Santo, Mato Grosso do Sul, Rondônia, Roraima, and Tocantins each have one.

In the finals, Mato Grosso's team Cuiabá defeated Pará's team Remo 6–5 on aggregate to win their first title and earn the right to play in the 2016 Copa Sudamericana.

Qualified teams

Schedule
The schedule of the competition is as follows.

Bracket

Finals

''Cuiabá won 6–5 on aggregate.

References 

Copa Verde
2015
2015 in Brazilian football